"All Stars" is a song by French DJ and record producer Martin Solveig, featuring vocals from Finnish singer-songwriter Alma. The song was released in France as a digital download on 16 June 2017 by Virgin EMI Records. The song was written by Amanda MNDR Warner, Peter Wade and Martin Picandet. The track premiered on 16 June 2017 as BBC Radio 1 DJ Annie Mac's "Hottest Record in the World". The song has peaked at number 11 on the French Singles Chart.

Music video
A music video to accompany the release of "All Stars" was first released onto YouTube on 11 July 2017 at a total length of two minutes and fifty-six seconds.

Track listing

Charts

Weekly charts

Year-end charts

Certifications

Release history

References

2017 singles
2017 songs
Martin Solveig songs
Songs written by Martin Solveig
Songs written by MNDR
Songs written by Peter Wade Keusch
Virgin EMI Records singles
Song recordings produced by Martin Solveig
Alma (Finnish singer) songs